The Handley Page HP.14, also designated Handley Page R/200 was a prototype British naval reconnaissance aircraft of World War I, capable of operating from the decks of the Royal Navy's aircraft carriers or as a floatplane.  Only three were built, the Parnall Panther being preferred.

Design and development
The R/200 was designed in 1917 to meet an Admiralty requirement for a two-seat  reconnaissance fighter capable of operating either as a floatplane or from the Royal Navy's new aircraft carriers, the flush deck HMS Argus and the partly converted cruiser HMS Furious.  The R/200 was a small single-bay biplane powered by a 200 hp (149 kW) geared Hispano-Suiza 8 V-8 engine with a frontal radiator.  Handley Page received an order for six prototypes in summer 1917.

The first two prototypes, fitted with floats were flown in December 1917, with the third prototype, fitted with a wheeled undercarriage flying in February 1918.  Test results were poorer than the competing Parnall Panther, and as Handley Page was concentrating on production and development of the O/400 and V/1500 heavy bombers, the remaining three prototypes, together with a prospective production order for 20 aircraft were cancelled in March 1918.

Specifications (R/200) (landplane)

See also

References

Barnes, C. H. Handley Page Aircraft Since 1907. London: Putnam, 1976. .
Bruce, J.M. British Aeroplanes 1914–18. London:Putnam, 1957.

External links
Handley Page R/200 – British Aircraft Directory

1910s British military reconnaissance aircraft
Carrier-based aircraft
Biplanes
Aircraft first flown in 1917